Henri Pulkkinen (born 26 February 1986), professionally known as Paperi T, is a Finnish rapper, poet and radio host. He started his career in a group Ruger Hauer in 2010 and released his first solo album Malarian pelko in 2015. Since 2017 he has been working as a music director for Radio Helsinki.

Selected discography

Solo albums

With Ruger Hauer

References

Living people
Finnish rappers
Finnish hip hop musicians
1986 births